"Tu Cuerpo" is a Pitbull song

Tu Cuerpo may also refer to:
"Tu Cuerpo", a 1989 single by Luis Enrique from the album Amor y Alegría